Andampy is a rural municipality in northern Madagascar. It belongs to the district of Antalaha, which is a part of Sava Region. The municipality has a populations of 6,843 inhabitants (2019).

Agriculture
The agriculture is mainly substancial: rice, manioc, banana, sugar cane and coco nuts. Next to it also vanilla, cloves and coffee is planted.

Tourism
It is situated at the border of the Masoala National Park.

References 

Populated places in Sava Region